Latvia competed at the 2019 European Games, in Minsk, Belarus from 21 to 30 June 2019. Latvia has previously competed at the 2015 European Games in Baku, Azerbaijan, where it won 2 medals, including one gold.

Archery

Recurve

Badminton

References

Nations at the 2019 European Games
European Games
2019